Aldra is an island in the municipality of Lurøy in Nordland county, Norway.  It is located just off the mainland coast, north of the village of Haugland and west of Brattland.  The island is separated from the mainland by the Aldersundet.  The islands of Stigen and Lurøya lie to the west.  The village of Aldra lies on the southeastern side of the island.

Aldra island is used as a VLF-transmission site. An antenna, spanning the fjord to Brattland, was used as part of the OMEGA Navigation System until 1997.  That antenna was dismantled in 2002.

References

External links
 Map of Aldra

Lurøy
Islands of Nordland